Hasanlar Dam is a dam in Düzce Province, Turkey, built between 1965 and 1972. The development was backed by the Turkish State Hydraulic Works.

See also

List of dams and reservoirs in Turkey

References
DSI, State Hydraulic Works (Turkey), Retrieved December 16, 2009

Dams in Düzce Province
Hydroelectric power stations in Turkey